Thompson Township is one of the fifteen townships of Seneca County, Ohio, United States.  The 2010 census found 1,443 people in the township.

Geography
Located in the northeastern corner of the county, it borders the following townships:
York Township, Sandusky County - north
Lyme Township, Huron County - northeast
Sherman Township, Huron County - southeast
Reed Township - south
Scipio Township - southwest corner
Adams Township - west
Green Creek Township, Sandusky County - northwest corner

No municipalities are located in Thompson Township, although the unincorporated community of Flat Rock lies in the northeastern part of the township.

Name and history
Thompson Township was established in 1820.

Statewide, other Thompson Townships are located in Delaware and Geauga counties.

Government
The township is governed by a three-member board of trustees, who are elected in November of odd-numbered years to a four-year term beginning on the following January 1. Two are elected in the year after the presidential election and one is elected in the year before it. There is also an elected township fiscal officer, who serves a four-year term beginning on April 1 of the year after the election, which is held in November of the year before the presidential election. Vacancies in the fiscal officership or on the board of trustees are filled by the remaining trustees.

References

External links
County website

Townships in Seneca County, Ohio
Townships in Ohio